Thiravam (English: Fluid) is a 2019 Indian-Tamil-language Thriller streaming television series created by Ravi Prakasam for Zee5. The series was directed by Arvind Krishna, starring Prasanna, Indhuja Ravichandran, Kaali Venkat and Azhagam Perumal. This Political Drama revolves around Scientist Ravi Prakasam's formula that can create Pertrol from Herbs and a number of groups who are after him and his Formula for their own gains. The first season consists of eight episodes and it started streaming from 21 May 2019.

Cast
 Prasanna as Ravi Prakasam
 Indhuja as Sahana
 Kaali Venkat as Sengi
 Azhagam Perumal 
 John Vijay 
 Swayam Siddha 
 Nagendra Prasad 
 Monekha Siva 
 Senthil

Episodes

References

External links
 
 Thiravam on ZEE5

ZEE5 original programming
Tamil-language web series
Tamil-language thriller television series
2019 Tamil-language television series debuts
2019 Tamil-language television series endings